(born July 20, 1968) is a Japanese video game designer and businessman. Starting his career as a programmer in the 1990s, he later took on roles in writing, design, directing and producing. He founded Level-5 in 1998, where he remains its president and CEO.

Biography 
Hino began his career in the video game industry in the late 1980s at the now defunct Japanese developer Riverhillsoft, specifically on the OverBlood series for the original PlayStation. Hino acted as the lead programmer on the first OverBlood, and was subsequently promoted to lead designer and director for the sequel, OverBlood 2.

Hino founded Level-5 in October 1998. Since the creation of Level-5, Hino has designed, planned and produced several of the studio's released titles, Dark Cloud, Dark Chronicle and Rogue Galaxy for the PlayStation 2, Jeanne d'Arc for the PlayStation Portable, and Professor Layton and the Curious Village for the Nintendo DS. He also directed Square Enix's Dragon Quest VIII: Journey of the Cursed King for the PlayStation 2.

Recently, Hino once again assumed designing and producing duties for Level-5's titles, White Knight Chronicles for the PlayStation 3, and the next two Professor Layton games – the Diabolical Box and the Unwound Future, both for the Nintendo DS, and Inazuma Eleven for the Nintendo DS, and Dragon Quest IX, also for the DS, which is his studio's second collaboration with role-playing video game powerhouse Square Enix.

Works

References

External links
 
Akihiro Hino at MobyGames

Level-5 (company)
Japanese video game producers
Japanese video game directors
Japanese video game programmers
Japanese video game designers
People from Ōmuta, Fukuoka
1968 births
Living people
Video game writers
Japanese business executives